Chong Yingbiao (Chinese: 崇应彪; Pinyin: Chóng Yīngbiāo) a character featured within the famed classic Chinese novel Fengshen Yanyi. Chong Yingbiao is the son of Chong Houhu, the Grand Duke of the North. 

During the coalition against Su Hu, Chong Yingbiao would support his father to his greatest potential. Following the death of Mei Wu, and Chong Houhu's retreat into the neighboring forest region, Chong Yingbiao would try his best to support his depressed father in any such way. Once Chong Houhu and all of his men were flamed out of the forest by Su Hu's forces, Chong Yingbiao would lead the rear guard in support. While in retreat, Chong Yingbiao would tell his father to send a letter to Ji Chang and immediately ask for troops to assist. Thus, Chong Yingbiao, combined with Chong Heihu would defend Chong Houhu to their ultimate level of strength. 

Following the end of the Su Hu coalition, Chong Yingbiao would remain as the head over Tiger Town, Chong Houhu's capital. Seven years following this point during King Wen's attack upon Tiger Town, Chong Yingbiao would defend the capital at his fullest potential. However, once the ruse of Chong Heihu was successful, Chong Yingbiao would be beheaded -- along with his father.

Chong Yingbiao was appointed as the deity in Jiuyao Xinggong (九曜星宫) in the end.

Notes

References
 Investiture of the Gods Chapter 3

Investiture of the Gods characters